This is a list of Swedish regiments and other military units (divisions, brigades, battalions, companies) that have existed since the 16th century. Most formations have changed names several times during their existence. Listed here are commonly used names.

Regiments were the highest organized organic units in the Swedish Army from the time of Gustavus Adolphus on to the Second World War. In 1949, the Swedish Army was reorganised, with the regiments being used as training units for conscripts during peacetime. The new main fighting unit was the brigade, only organised in wartime (with a few exceptions). The division (fördelning) is not a static organization, but can have brigades assigned and removed when needed, similar to other countries' corps formations.

For a short background of the Swedish conscription system historically used, see the article on the Swedish allotment system.

Grand regiments 

Storregementen or landsregementen (regiments of the land), these regiments were organized by Gustavus Adolphus in the end of the 1610s from the smaller units fänika and fana raised in the various parts of Sweden during the time of Gustav Vasa:

 Norrlands storregemente (Norrland Grand Regiment)
 Upplands storregemente (Uppland Grand Regiment)
 Södermanlands storregemente (Södermanland Grand Regiment)
 Östergötlands storregemente (Östergötland Grand Regiment)
 Västergötlands storregemente (Västergötland Grand Regiment)
 Smålands storregemente (Småland Grand Regiment)
 Finlands storregemente (Österbotten Grand Regiment)
 Karelska storregementet (Karelian Grand Regiment)
 Västra Finlands storregemente (Western Finland Grand Regiment)
 Mellersta Finlands storregemente (Middle Finland Grand Regiment)
 Östra Finlands storregementet (Eastern Finland Grand Regiment)

Infantry and cavalry regiments 

The original provincial regiments (landskapsregementen) were raised by splitting the old grand regiments, forming 20 infantry (actually 21 as Smålands regemente was split into Kronobergs and Jönköpings regemente) and eight cavalry regiments as written in the Swedish constitution of 1634. As time went on, new regiments were raised by conscription, created by splitting old regiments or enlisting soldiers from various dominions of Sweden. There were also times when temporary regiments were raised; these regiments were called männingsregementen.

Infantry

Cavalry

Artillery and other regiments

Artillery

Armour

Anti-aircraft

Coastal artillery

Engineer

Signal

Logistic

See also 
Swedish Armed Forces
Military district
List of Swedish defence districts
List of Swedish wars

References 

Print

 Braunstein, Christian (2003). Sveriges arméförband under 1900-talet. Stockholm: Statens Försvarshistoriska Museer. 
 Holmberg, Björn (1993). Arméns regementen, skolor och staber: en sammanställning. Arvidsjaur: Svenskt Militärhistoriskt Bibliotek. 
 Nelsson, Bertil (1993). Från Brunkeberg till Nordanvind: 500 år med svenskt infanteri. Stockholm: Probus. 
 Nordisk Familjebok: första utgåvan. (1876–1899). Stockholm: Expeditionen af Nordisk familjebok. Online version at Projekt Runeberg
 Nordisk Familjebok: uggleupplagan. (1904–1926). Stockholm: Nordisk familjeboks förlag. Online version at Projekt Runeberg
 Svensk rikskalender 1908. (1908). Stockholm: P.A. Norstedt & Söner. Online version at Projekt Runeberg

Online

 Holmén, Pelle, & Sjöberg, Jan (2004). Swedish Armed Forces 1900-2000. Retrieved Dec. 14, 2004.
 Högman, Hans (2001). Militaria - Svensk militärhistoria. Retrieved Dec. 14, 2004.
 Persson, Mats (1998). Swedish Army Regiments. Retrieved Dec. 14, 2004.
 Sharman, Ken (2000). Swedish military administrative division as per 1629. Retrieved Dec. 14, 2004.

 
 Regiments

sv:Regemente